The Oberon Tarana Heritage Railway inc (OTHR) is a volunteer association aiming to reopen the Oberon to Tarana railway line in the Central Tablelands of New South Wales, Australia, and run heritage trains.

The Line

The Oberon railway line is a 24-kilometre disused branch railway, which junctions with the Main Western line at Tarana and heads in a southerly direction to the town of Oberon. Opened on 3 October 1923, the line was lightly constructed, and included steep grades (1 in 25 or 4 %) and tight curves. It was operated by lightweight locomotives, mainly 19 class steam locomotives, and then 49 class diesels. It transported local seasonal vegetables, timber and livestock. Passenger services ceased in 1971, and freight services in 1979, with the line effectively closing then.

Rolling stock
In May 2010, end platform carriages CBA850 and HLF854 were acquired on loan from the New South Wales Rail Transport Museum, as well as railmotor CPH13 from the Canberra Railway Museum. In May 2010,  locomotives 7307 and 7321 were purchased from Patrick Portlink.

Goals
 to ensure the preservation of the existing rail infrastructure between & including both the junction station at Tarana and the terminus at Oberon
 to operate in consultation and co-operation with the local Councils, local landholders and the broader Oberon / Tarana community
 to progressively rebuild the line in stages to accommodate light traffic such as Railmotors (possibly a CPH rail motor or others) or by means of a light locomotive and carriages.
 in the first stages of development, utilise OTHR volunteers and donated machinery to facilitate reconstruction
 to initially focus on the reconstruction of the line and associated infrastructure
 to encourage the resumption of commercial use of the line

The restoration of the line is being undertaken in three stages.
 Stage 1: Oberon to Hazelgrove
 Stage 2: Hazelgrove to Carlwood
 Stage 3: Carlwood to Tarana

References

Railway museums in New South Wales
Oberon Council